Jim Mayer (born October 30, 1954) is a Canadian former professional ice hockey player who played four games in the National Hockey League, and 74 in the World Hockey Association. Mayer was born in Capreol, Ontario, and played with the New England Whalers, Calgary Cowboys, Edmonton Oilers, and the New York Rangers.

Career
Mayer played junior hockey with the Chelmsford Canadiens, and won the Northern Ontario Junior Hockey League Rookie of the Year award in the 1971–72 season. He was drafted 239th overall by the Rangers in the 1974 NHL amateur draft. In the 1978–79 CHL season, Mayer scored 33 goals, and 43 assists with the Dallas Black Hawks, and was a second team all-star in the Central Hockey League.

References

1954 births
Calgary Cowboys players
Canadian ice hockey right wingers
Edmonton Oilers (WHA) players
Ice hockey people from Ontario
Living people
Michigan Tech Huskies men's ice hockey players
NCAA men's ice hockey national champions
New England Whalers players
New York Rangers draft picks
New York Rangers players
Sportspeople from Greater Sudbury
Springfield Indians players
Tidewater Sharks players